Paul Ayshford Methuen, 4th Baron Methuen  (29 September 1886 – 7 January 1974) was a painter, zoologist and landowner.

Life
From 1910 to 1914 he worked in the Transvaal Museum in Pretoria, where he published several scientific papers with the South African herpetologist, John Hewitt, with whom he collected and described a number of southern African and Madagascan genera and species in the early 20th century. He later refused a chair in zoology at a South African university because of his commitment to his ancestral home.

Methuen had studied drawing at Eton, at the Ruskin in Oxford, and with Charles Holmes. In 1927 he attended art classes given by Walter Sickert, which had a permanent effect on his painting style. He established a reputation as a serious artist. His preferred subjects were urban views and outdoor scenes with buildings, animals, and plants, such as the magnolias and orchids he grew at Corsham Court.

In 1939 he rejoined his regiment and served as a captain until 1944 when he was moved to the Procurement and Fine Art branch set up to protect works of art during the invasion of the continent. He later recounted his experiences in his book Normandy Diary. During the War, Methuen also received a number of commissions from the War Artists' Advisory Committee, mainly for scenes painted in the London dockyards.

Four years after the destruction of the premises of the Bath School of Art in 1942, Methuen offered Corsham Court, which during the war had been first the temporary home of Westonbirt School and then a convalescent hospital for officers, to the new Bath Academy of Art under Clifford Ellis. It remained there until 1972; Corsham Court is now used by Bath Spa University.

From 1939 to 1971, Methuen was president of the Royal West of England Academy in Bristol. He was elected an Associate of the Royal Academy in 1951, and became a Royal Academician in 1959. He was also elected an Honorary Associate of the Royal Institute of British Architects (Hon ARIBA) in 1947 and a fellow of the Society of Antiquaries in 1951.

Legacy

A species of South African lizard, Lygodactylus methueni, is named in honor of Paul Ayshford Methuen.

Arms

Publications

References

External links

1886 births
1974 deaths
20th-century British zoologists
Associates of the Royal Institute of British Architects
Paul 4
British Army personnel of World War I
British herpetologists
British war artists
Eldest sons of British hereditary barons
Members of the Royal West of England Academy
Paul Ayshford
Monuments men
People educated at Eton College
People from Corsham
Royal Academicians
Royal Wiltshire Yeomanry officers
World War II artists